On July 7, 2015, an F-16 fighter jet operated by the United States Air Force collided in-flight with a private Cessna 150 single-engine light aircraft over Moncks Corner, South Carolina, United States. Both occupants of the Cessna were killed; the pilot of the F-16 ejected safely.

The subsequent investigation found that the local Air Traffic Control unit had failed to ensure adequate separation between the two aircraft.

Collision 
Witnesses state that the Cessna was climbing when the F-16 hit it broadside. The Cessna (N3601V) was climbing out of the MKS airport under visual flight rules, not in communication with FAA Air Traffic Control. Death 41 (the F-16)  was on an ATC assigned heading of 260 degrees and issued a descent to maintain 1600' for an ILS approach to Runway15 at KCHS.

At 1100:16, the CHS ATC approach controller issued a traffic advisory advising the F-16 pilot of "traffic 12 o'clock, 2 miles, opposite direction, 1,200 [ft altitude] indicated, type unknown." At 1100:24, the F-16 pilot responded that he was "looking" for the traffic. At 1100:26, the controller advised the F-16 pilot, "turn left heading 180 if you don't have that traffic in sight." At 1100:30, the pilot asked, "confirm 2 miles?" At 1100:33, the controller stated, "if you don't have that traffic in sight turn left heading 180 immediately." As the controller was stating the instruction and over the next 18 seconds, the radar-derived ground track of the F-16 began turning southerly toward the designated heading.

At 1100:49, the radar target of the F-16 was 1/2 nm northeast of the Cessna, at an altitude of 1,500 ft, and was on an approximate track of 215°. At that time, the Cessna reported an altitude of 1,400 ft and was established on an approximate ground track of 110°. The two aircraft collided at an approximate altitude of 1450 ft.

The F-16 flew for a further three minutes before the pilot transmitted a mayday call. He then ejected safely. Both aircraft crashed in Lewisfield Plantation. Both occupants of  the Cessna 150 were killed. The pilot of the F-16 was on an instrument training mission. Its destination was Joint Base Charleston. The Cessna was reported to be on a flight from Berkeley County Airport to Myrtle Beach.

Aircraft 
Of the two aircraft involved, the first one was a General Dynamics F-16C Fighting Falcon, serial number 96-0085. It was based at Shaw Air Force Base, South Carolina, and was operated by the 20th Fighter Wing of the United States Air Force. The second one was a privately-owned Cessna 150M light aircraft, registration N3601V.

Investigation
The National Transportation Safety Board conducted the investigation into the accident. The cause of the collision was found to be Air Traffic Control errors in failing to provide an appropriate conflict resolution between the two aircraft. The Federal Aviation Administration also opened an investigation.

References

Aviation accidents and incidents in the United States in 2015
Aviation accidents and incidents in South Carolina
Mid-air collisions
Mid-air collisions involving general aviation aircraft
Mid-air collisions involving military aircraft
Accidents and incidents involving United States Air Force aircraft
General Dynamics F-16 Fighting Falcon
2015 in South Carolina
July 2015 events in the United States
Berkeley County, South Carolina